Summit Conference of Heads of State or Government of the Non-Aligned Movement on 1–6 September 1961 in Belgrade, Yugoslavia was the first conference of the Non-Aligned Movement. A major contributing factor to the organization of the conference was the process of decolonization of a number of African countries in the 1960s. Some therefore called it the ″Third World's Yalta″ in reference to 1945 Yalta Conference.

Twenty-five countries in total participated in Belgrade Conference, while 3 countries, Bolivia, Brazil and Ecuador, were observers. The preparatory meeting of Non-Aligned Countries took place earlier that year in Cairo June 5–12, 1961. One of the issues was division of the newly independent countries over the Congo Crisis which led to a rift and creation of the conservative and anti-radical Brazzaville Group and radical nationalist Casablanca Group.  All members of the Casablanca Group attended the conference, including Algeria, Ghana, Guinea, Mali, Morocco and the United Arab Republic, while none of the Brazzaville Group was present. The summit was followed by the 2nd Summit of the Non-Aligned Movement in Cairo in 1964. The 1962 Cairo Conference on the Problems of Developing Countries was a direct follow up of the Belgrade Summit at which Brazil, Ethiopia, India, Senegal and Yugoslavia will work on preparation for the upcoming UNCTAD conference of the ECOSOC.

The Conference

Vladimir Popović was the head of the Yugoslav State Committee for the Preparation of the Conference. The conference brought together 25 independent states. In addition to them, there were three states that had observer status, eleven socialist parties, trade unions from Japan and four other organizations. Socio-economic differences between participants were great and from the beginning participating states often showed different interests. Yugoslavia attached special importance to Latin American countries participation. The participation of these countries, along with the representatives of Europe, should have given the conference the character of a gathering where all parts of the world are represented, and avoid reduction to Afro-Asian meeting as it was case with some meetings before.

President Tito only partially succeeded bringing together all parts of the world to the conference. From Latin America, only Cuba was a full participant, while Bolivia, Brazil and Ecuador had observer status. The reason for that was the inability of these states to resist some pressure from the United States which wanted to preserve its role in the Western Hemisphere. The representatives of Yugoslavia were especially disappointed with Mexico's last minute cancelation. Of the European countries, only Cyprus and Yugoslavia as a host participated in the meeting.

The conference was followed by 1,016 journalists of which 690 were from abroad from 53 different countries and with the New York Times' Paul Hofmann describing the event as a "paradise for cameramen". Together, four Indian newspapers (The Times of India, The Hindu Madras, Indian Express and The Patriot (India)) and four American newspapers (New York Times, The Washington Post, Los Angeles Times and The Christian Science Monitor) published 177,265 words about the conference in 7 days before, during and 7 days after the conference.

Participants
 Mohammed Daoud Khan, Prime Minister of Afghanistan
 Benyoucef Benkhedda, Head of the Provisional Government of the Algerian Republic
 U Nu, Prime Minister of Burma
 Norodom Sihanouk, Chief of State of Cambodia
 Sirimavo Bandaranaike, Prime Minister of Ceylon
 Cyrille Adoula, Prime Minister of Congo-Léopoldville and Antoine Gizenga, Deputy Prime Minister
 Osvaldo Dorticós Torrado, President of Cuba
 Makarios III, President of Cyprus
 Haile Selassie, Emperor of Ethiopia
 Kwame Nkrumah, President of Ghana
 Louis Lansana Beavogui, Foreign Minister of Guinea
 Jawaharlal Nehru, Prime Minister of India
 Sukarno, President of Indonesia
 Hashem Jawad, Foreign Minister of Iraq
 Saeb Salam, Prime Minister of Lebanon
 Modibo Keïta, President of Mali
 Hassan II, King of Morocco
 Mahendra, King of Nepal
 Ibrahim bin Abdullah Al Suwaiyel, Foreign Minister of Saudi Arabia 
 Aden Adde, President of Somalia
 Ibrahim Abboud, President of Sudan
 Habib Bourguiba, President of Tunisia
 Gamal Abdel Nasser, President of the United Arab Republic
 Prince Seif el Islam el Hassan, Prime Minister of the Mutawakkilite Kingdom of Yemen
 Josip Broz Tito, President of Yugoslavia

Observers
 José Fellman, Minister of Education of Bolivia and Jorge Gutierrez Allendrebe, minister plenipotentiary
 Franco Filho de Mello, Brazilian Ambassador to Switzerland
 Jose Joaquin Silva, Ecuadorian Ambassador to West Germany

Guests
 Robert Ford
 George F. Kennan
 Michael Creswell

See also
 Yugoslavia and the Non-Aligned Movement
 50th Anniversary Additional Commemorative Non-Aligned Meeting
 60th Anniversary Additional Commemorative Non-Aligned Meeting

References

External links
 

Summit 1st
Foreign relations of Yugoslavia
1960s in Belgrade
1961 conferences
1961 in politics
1961 in Yugoslavia